Gustaf Oscar Peyron (5 January 1828 – 2 March 1915) was a Swedish military officer and politician. He was born in Nyköping as the son of future Minister for War Gustaf Peyron.

Gustaf Oscar Peyron later followed in his father's footsteps and acted as Minister for War between 4 October 1887 and 6 February 1888.

1828 births
1915 deaths
Swedish Army lieutenant generals
Members of the Första kammaren
Swedish Ministers for Defence
Swedish nobility
Members of the Royal Swedish Academy of War Sciences
People from Nyköping Municipality
Commanders Grand Cross of the Order of the Sword
Knights of the Order of Charles XIII